The South African Railways Class  of 1974 is a diesel-electric locomotive.

Between November 1974 and August 1976, the South African Railways placed 150 Class  General Motors Electro-Motive Division type GT18MC diesel-electric locomotives in service. In 1975, one more Class  locomotive was built for AECI in Modderfontein, Johannesburg.

Manufacturer
The Class  type GT18MC diesel-electric locomotive was designed for the South African Railways (SAR) by General Motors Electro-Motive Division (GM-EMD).

While the first GMSA batch was being built, an order for one Class  GT18MC locomotive was received from AECI in Modderfontein, Johannesburg. Since it required urgent delivery, no.  (works no. ) from the SAR order was delivered to AECI and became their no. 2, named "A.J. de Beer". The AECI locomotive, works no. , then went to the SAR as no. .

Class 35 series

GE and GM-EMD designs
Both manufacturers also produced locomotives for the South African Classes 33, 34 and 36.

Distinguishing features

Service

South African Railways
The Class 35 family is South Africa’s standard branchline diesel-electric locomotive. GM-EMD Class  were designed for light rail conditions across difficult terrain and they work on most branch lines in the central, eastern, northern  and north-eastern parts of the country.

Zambia
Between October 1978 and May 1993, Zambia Railways (ZR) hired locomotives to solve its chronic shortages in motive power, mainly from South Africa but at times also from Zaire, Zimbabwe, the TAZARA Railway and even the Zambian Copper Mines. In Zambia, the South African locomotives were mainly used on goods trains between Livingstone and Kitwe, sometimes in tandem with a ZR locomotive and occasionally also on passenger trains.

The first period of hire lasted from October 1978 until about April 1981. The South African fleet in Zambia was never constant, since locomotives were continually exchanged when they became due back in South Africa for their three-monthly services.

In November 1979, six Class  locomotives were on hire, but they are believed to have left Zambia in early 1980. A full list of the locomotives which were used in Zambia is not available, but no.  is known to have been used there during this period.

CamRail and Sudan Railways
Nine Class  locomotives were leased to CamRail, a company which had a twenty-year concession to operate the Cameroon National Railway. Six of these later went on a second lease until June 2007 to Sudan Railways, where they were numbered in the range from 3601 to 3606.

FCA and FSA, Brazil
Fifteen Class  locomotives went to Ferrovia Centro Atlântico (FCA) and Ferrovia Sul Atlântico (FSA) in Brazil, where they were also regauged to run on metre gauge. Both these railroads are now part of América Latina Logística (ALL), which operates in Brazil and Argentina.

Ten of these units went to FCA at Divinipolis in Brazil. While they were initially part of Spoornet Traction’s leasing scheme, they were later renumbered onto the FCA roster in the range from 8200 to 8209. The other five locomotives went to FSA at Curitiba in Brazil. Also initially part of Spoornet Traction’s leasing scheme, they were later renumbered onto the FSA roster in the range from 8210 to 8214.

Works numbers
The Class  builders, works numbers, lease details and renumberings are listed in the table.

Liveries
The Class 35-200 were all delivered in the SAR Gulf Red livery with signal red buffer beams, yellow side stripes on the long hood sides and a yellow V on each end. In the 1990s many of the Class  units began to be repainted in the Spoornet orange livery with a yellow and blue chevron pattern on the buffer beams. Several later received the Spoornet maroon livery. In the late 1990s many were repainted in the Spoornet blue livery with outline numbers on the long hood sides. After 2008 in the Transnet Freight Rail (TFR) and Passenger Rail Agency of South Africa (PRASA) era, many were repainted in the TFR red, green and yellow livery and at least two were repainted in the PRASA purple Shosholoza Meyl livery.

Illustration

References

External links

3430
Electro-Motive Division locomotives
GMSA locomotives
C-C locomotives
Co′Co′ locomotives
Co+Co locomotives
Cape gauge railway locomotives
Railway locomotives introduced in 1974
1974 in South Africa